Joshua Cromwell (19 July 1887 – 28 September 1949) was a cricketer. He played in two first-class matches for British Guiana in 1907/08 and 1912/13.

See also
 List of Guyanese representative cricketers

References

External links
 

1887 births
1949 deaths
Cricketers from British Guiana